The index of physics articles is split into multiple pages due to its size.

To navigate by individual letter use the table of contents below.

!$@

't Hooft loop
't Hooft symbol
't Hooft–Polyakov monopole
(2+1)-dimensional topological gravity
(n-p) reaction
(−1)F
ΔT

Indexes of physics articles